Ernst Krause (–1987) was a German entomologist. He was born in Berlin in 1899 and was the official cameraman in Ernst Schäfer's expedition to Tibet in 1938–1939.

References

1899 births
1987 deaths
German entomologists
Scientists from Berlin
Photography in Tibet
Waffen-SS personnel
20th-century German zoologists